Seydou Badian Kouyaté (April 10, 1928  – December 28, 2018) was a Malian writer and politician. He wrote the lyrics to the Malian national anthem, "Le Mali".

Early life and education
Born in Bamako, Kouyaté studied medicine at the University of Montpellier in France before returning to Mali.

Career
Under president Modibo Keïta, he wrote the words for Mali's national anthem, "Le Mali". In the Plan of September 17, 1962 he was named Minister of Economic and Financial Coordination; however, with the coup d'état of 1968, and the rise to the presidency of Moussa Traoré, he was deported to Kidal before being exiled to Dakar, in Senegal.  Associated from its beginning with the Sudanese Union-African Democratic Rally, he was removed from the party in 1998 for having opposed part of its plan to refuse recognition to certain institutions participating in contested elections.

Kouyaté is also internationally known as a writer; even before Mali's independence, in 1957, he had published his first novel, Sous l'orage.  This was followed by two other novels, Le Sang des masques in 1976 and Noces sacrées in 1977.  In 2007 his novel La Saison des pièges was published.

In March 2018, Seydou Badian was awarded the Grand Prix des Mécènes of the GPLA 2017, as a tribute to all his bibliographic career.

Works
 1957 : Sous l’orage
 1962 : La Mort de Chaka
 1965 : Les Dirigeants africains face à leurs peuples, Grand prix littéraire d'Afrique noire 
 1976 : Le Sang des masques
 1977 : Noces sacrées
 2007 : La Saison des pièges, Nouvelles éditions ivoiriennes and Présence africaine

Awards
 Grand prix littéraire d'Afrique noire
 Grand Prix des Mécènes (GPLA 2017).

References

1928 births
2018 deaths
Malian novelists
People from Bamako
National anthem writers
Sudanese Union – African Democratic Rally politicians
Malian expatriates in Senegal
Government ministers of Mali
Male novelists
Malian male writers
Malian exiles
20th-century novelists
21st-century novelists
20th-century male writers
21st-century male writers
21st-century Malian people